John Shahidi is the President of Shots Podcast Network and Happy Dad Hard Seltzer. Also, a partner of the popular YouTube group, Nelk Boys.

On October 28, 2022, Shahidi became an investor and advisor to Twitter and Elon Musk.

With his brother Sam Shahidi, the two started Shots Podcast Network, a YouTube podcast network for top internet brands and talent including Full Send Podcast, Mike Tyson, The Pivot Podcast and Lele Pons Show. 

Shahidi has also created multiple successful NFTs, including the Full Send Metacard and Full Send x Alien Frens.

Early life
John Shahidi was born to an Iranian Kurdish family in Los Angeles, California and grew up in Orange County, California.

He and his younger brother Sam Shahidi grew up in Southern California. They were raised by their mother and grandmother.

Career

Justin Bieber Partnership
John and Sam Shahidi started developing iOS apps in 2009 and started out as a video game development company called Rock Software, later renamed RockLive. Their first commercial app was RunPee. Their childhood friend Jordan Palmer introduced the Shahidi brothers to former Cincinnati Bengals team member Chad "Ochocinco" Johnson. RockLive developed two apps for Ochocinco, Chad Ochocinco Experience, and its follow-up, MadChad.

This exposure led to more apps being developed between 2009 and 2012, for Usain Bolt, Cristiano Ronaldo and Mike Tyson.

RockLive released Shots, a selfie photo sharing app, in November 2013. It was launched with Justin Bieber & Floyd Mayweather as partners.

The inspiration for the app came after Facebook was forced to take down a page that attracted cyberbullying. Shahidi, who had been bullied as an overweight child, said "I don't want any kid or adult to have to feel inadequate like I did". Photos had to be taken real-time, without the use of filters or other editing material, and users could not comment on pictures or see how many "likes" other people received.

Shots grew to a user base of 7 million users in March 2016, but dropped to 2.5 million in October 2016. At one point, Twitter was in talks to buy Shots for US$150 million.

Many notable creators were a part of the app before moving to Instagram including Snoop Dogg, Shaquille O'Neal, and Vine creators King Bach, Jake Paul, Rudy Mancuso and Lele Pons.

Shots Podcast Network & YouTube

After raising $12.1 million in funding in 2015 and with the number of the Shots app users dropping, the company pivoted from software to content. RockLive rebranded to Shots Studios, a talent agency and production studio for social media personalities, predominantly on YouTube. Investors included boxer Floyd Mayweather and singer Justin Bieber.

In February 2018, Shahidi was a featured panelist at Upfront Summit where they spoke about topics impacting digital creation and social media.

Both Shahidi brothers were honored by Billboard as Latin Power Players for their success in developing the Latin American music careers of Brazilian singer Anitta and Venezuelan-Italian artist Lele Pons.

Shahidi executive produced Vai Anitta, a Shots Studios-produced Netflix original docu-series centered around the Brazilian superstar.

Shahidi joined Kurt Wagner on his Recode podcast to speak about the way Shots Studios connects with platforms like Netflix and YouTube, creating content that is catered to a specific audience, all the way down to the type of devices that they use.

In 2020, Shahidi teamed up with YouTube Originals and executive produced The Secret Life of Lele Pons, a Shots Studios-produced YouTube Originals docuseries focused on Pons' private struggles with mental health and fame.

Nelk & Full Send

In late 2020, Shots Studios partnered with YouTube creators, The Nelk Boys to help their YouTube channels and Shahidi became President of their brand, Full Send.

On May 31, Nelk announced a new venture with Shahidi called Happy Dad Hard Seltzer's.

Since running the Nelk operations, the company has begun launching and optimizing its own products and brought over $70M USD in revenue in 2020.

References

External links

21st-century American businesspeople
Businesspeople from California
American chairpersons of corporations
American people of Kurdish descent
American people of Iranian descent
Living people
Year of birth missing (living people)